Kupittaa is a district in Turku, Finland. It is located on the eastern side of the city's centre, around the Kupittaa Park, the first landscaped park in a Finnish city. The district serves as a centre for recreation and business. Turku has recently planned a residential area for 750 residents on the premises of a former HKScan sausage factory.

The area hosts, among other things, numerous sports facilities, such as the Veritas Stadion, a Finnish baseball stadium, a velodrome, a bowling alley, a skateboarding area and a BMX track, and the Kupittaa open-air swimming pools. The ice hockey arena in the district was demolished in 2005. A new one was inaugurated in November 2006.

Most of the Turku Science Park business centre is located in Kupittaa. The centre is currently expanding around Kupittaa railway station, next to Finnish national road 1 (part of European route E18) between Helsinki and Turku.

According to a version of the legend, the first pagan Finns were baptised into Christianity by the Bishop Henry at a spring in Kupittaa Park on Midsummer Day in the year 1155. In the 18th century, the spring was used as a spa facility.

Name
The name Kupittaa may be associated with an old border and may be related to the word , a name for a boundary mark. Another theory is that it comes from the Russian word for a merchant, .

See also
 Turku Science Park

References

External links

Districts of Turku